John Glenn LeBlanc (born January 21, 1964) is a Canadian former professional ice hockey left winger.  He played 83 games in the National Hockey League with the Vancouver Canucks, Edmonton Oilers, and Winnipeg Jets.  He scored 26 goals and 13 assists in his NHL career.

His best professional season came in 1989-90 when, as a member of the Cape Breton Oilers, he led all American Hockey League scorers with 54 regular-season goals.

Career statistics

Regular season and playoffs

External links

1964 births
Bakersfield Condors (1998–2015) players
Canadian ice hockey left wingers
Cape Breton Oilers players
Edmonton Oilers players
Fort Wayne Komets players
Fredericton Express players
Hull Olympiques players
Ice hockey people from New Brunswick
Living people
Milwaukee Admirals (IHL) players
Moncton Hawks players
New Brunswick Varsity Reds ice hockey players
Orlando Solar Bears (IHL) players
People from Campbellton, New Brunswick
Springfield Falcons players
Undrafted National Hockey League players
Utah Grizzlies (IHL) players
Vancouver Canucks players
Winnipeg Jets (1979–1996) players
Canadian expatriate ice hockey players in the United States